Livia Turco (born 13 February 1955 in Cuneo) is an Italian politician, member of the Democratic Party. She was a member of parliament between 1987–2013. Turco was Minister of Social Affairs in three governments between 1996–2001, and Minister of Health between 2006–2008.

Political career
She came from a working-class background in Morozzo, Cuneo, and studied in Cuneo and Turin, where she began her political career with the Communist Party, becoming a deputy in 1987. Later, she was Director of the Communist Youth League, a regional councillor, and responsible for women in the local party federation.

Following the dissolution of the Communist Party in 1991, she joined the Democratic Party of the Left, and then the Democrats of the Left, as a deputy in 1992–2001.

From May 1996 to October 1998, she was Minister of Social Affairs (Solidarietà Sociale) in the first Prodi, and then the D'Alema (1998–2000) and Amato (2000–2001) governments.

In 2000, she unsuccessfully ran for President of Piedmont, and was elected a senator for Piedmont in 2006. She then became Minister of Health in the second Prodi government (2006–2008). Following the fall of Prodi, she was elected to the Chamber of Deputies in April 2008 as a member of the center-left Democratic Party.

Her name is attached to the 1998 immigration act known as Legge Turco-Napolitano (L. 40/98), as well as the 2000 parental leave and time regulation in cities act, also known as the Turco Act (Legge 53/2000).

Honours and awards 
 : Grand Cross Dame of the Order of Merit of the Italian Republic (27 December 2017)

References

External links
 Livia Turco's Blog
 Profile on the Chamber of Deputies website
 Profile on the Senate website
 Livia Turco on Openpolis

1955 births
Living people
People from Cuneo
Italian Communist Party politicians
20th-century Italian politicians
Democrats of the Left politicians
Democratic Party (Italy) politicians
21st-century Italian politicians
Government ministers of Italy
Italian Ministers of Health
Women government ministers of Italy
20th-century Italian women
21st-century Italian women